John Martins may refer to:

 John Martin's, a chain of department stores in South Australia
 John Martins (boxer) (born 1950), Nigerian boxer